Shakopee High School is a four-year public high school as of fall 2018 located in Shakopee, Minnesota, United States. The school district serves nearly 8,380 students in Shakopee, Savage, Prior Lake, and the Jackson, Louisville, and Sand Creek Townships. The district is located in one of the fastest-growing suburbs in the Twin Cities. The high school received a major expansion and was reopened after a summer of construction in the fall of 2018.

History
Shakopee High School was located at 200 10th Avenue East until the fall of 2007 when the current high school opened at 100 17th Avenue West.

School Facilities
The current Shakopee High School was opened in 2007, and the building that previously served as the high school is now Shakopee West Middle School. The high school expansion construction began in the Summer, 2016. The newly expanded Shakopee High School is 322,000 Sq. Feet and has a student capacity of 1,600 students. The expansion included new classrooms, computer labs, athletic facilities, and an auditorium with 800 seats.

Athletics
Shakopee High School has won a total of eight state championships, including five championships sponsored by the Minnesota State High School League. The school's volleyball team won three straight Class 3A state titles in 2007, 2008 and 2009. The boys' basketball team won the Class 3A state championship in 2005. The school also won the 2015 Adaptive Softball state title as part of a co-op with Chaska, Chanhassen and Prior Lake. Additionally, the school won the boys' track and field true team state title in 1995 and the girls' track and field true team state title in both 1995 and 1996.

Demographics
As of 20172018, approximately 59.8% of students are white, 12.6% are Hispanic or Latino, 13.9% of students are Asian, and 9% are black or African-American. 29.4% of students are reported to be on the free or reduced-price meal plan offered by the school.

Notable people and alumni
 Jamal Abu-Shamala, Professional Basketball Player
 Charlie Vig, Chairman of the Shakopee Mdewakanton Sioux Community

References

External links
Shakopee Senior High in SHAKOPEE, MN | Best High Schools | US News

Educational institutions established in 2007
Schools in Scott County, Minnesota
Public high schools in Minnesota
2007 establishments in Minnesota